Horace Terhune Herrick, (April 22, 1887 – October 8, 1948) was a scientist, and director of the North Regional Research Laboratory of the United States Department of Agriculture.

Biography
Herrick was born in Newark, New Jersey on April 22, 1887 to James Frederick Herrick and Christine Terhune Herrick. He graduated from Columbia University from the Henry Krumb School of Mines with a degree in chemical engineering and by 1910 was working in the research laboratories of the New Jersey Zinc Company, in Palmerton, Pennsylvania.

In 1929 he developed a process for making gluconic acid by fermentation with Orville E. May
 which was subsequently covered in wider media.

He died on October 8, 1948.

References

1887 births
1948 deaths
United States Department of Agriculture officials
20th-century American chemists
People from Newark, New Jersey
Columbia School of Engineering and Applied Science alumni
Scientists from New Jersey